Caravaggio is a 1986 British historical drama film directed by Derek Jarman. The film is a fictionalised retelling of the life of Baroque painter Michelangelo Merisi da Caravaggio. It is the film debut of Tilda Swinton and Sean Bean.

Plot
Told in a segmented fashion, the film opens as Caravaggio dies from lead poisoning while in exile, with only his long-time, deaf companion Jerusaleme, who was given by his family to the artist as a boy, by his side. Caravaggio thinks back to his life as a teenage street ruffian who hustles and paints. While taken ill and in the care of priests, young Caravaggio catches the eye of Cardinal Francesco Maria del Monte. The Cardinal nurtures Caravaggio's artistic and intellectual development but seems to molest him.

As an adult, Caravaggio still lives under the roof and paints with the funding of Del Monte. Caravaggio is shown employing street people, drunks and prostitutes as models for his intense, usually religious paintings. He is depicted as frequently brawling, gambling, getting drunk and is implied to sleep with both male and female models. In the art world, Caravaggio is regarded as vulgar and entitled for his Vatican connections.

One day, Ranuccio, a street fighter for pay, catches Caravaggio's eye as a subject and potential lover. Ranuccio also introduces Caravaggio to his girlfriend Lena, who also becomes an object of attraction and a model to the artist. When both Ranuccio and Lena are separately caught kissing Caravaggio, each displays jealousy over the artist's attentions. One day, Lena announces she is pregnant without stating who the father is and will become a mistress to the wealthy Scipione Borghese. Soon, she is found murdered by drowning. Ranuccio weeps as Caravaggio and Jerusaleme clean Lena's body. Caravaggio is shown painting Lena after she dies and mournfully writhing with her body. Ranuccio is arrested for Lena's murder, but he claims to be innocent. Caravaggio pulls strings and goes to the pope to free Ranuccio. When Ranuccio is freed, he tells Caravaggio he killed Lena so they could be together. In response, Caravaggio cuts Ranuccio's throat, killing him. Back on his deathbed, Caravaggio is shown having visions of himself as a boy and trying to refuse the last rites offered him by the priests.

Cast

Production

Set design
In keeping with Caravaggio's use of contemporary dress for his Biblical figures, Jarman intentionally includes several anachronisms in the film that do not fit with Caravaggio's life in the 16th century. In one scene, Caravaggio is in a bar lit with electric lights. Another character is seen using an electronic calculator. Car horns are heard honking outside Caravaggio's studio, and in one scene, Caravaggio is seen leaning on a green truck. Cigarette smoking, a motorbike, and the use of a manual typewriter also featured in the film.

Production design
The production designer was Christopher Hobbs who was also responsible for the copies of Caravaggio paintings seen in the film.

Details and awards
Caravaggio was Jarman's first project with Tilda Swinton, and it was her first film role. The cook Jennifer Paterson was an extra. The film was entered into the 36th Berlin International Film Festival where it won the Silver Bear for an outstanding single achievement.

Home media
Caravaggio was released on DVD by Umbrella Entertainment in July 2008. The DVD is compatible with all region codes and includes special features such as the trailer, a gallery of production designs and storyboards, feature commentary by Gabriel Berestain, an interview with Christopher Hobbs titled Italy of the Memory, and interviews with Tilda Swinton, Derek Jarman, Nigel Terry.

See also
 BFI Top 100 British films

References

External links
 
 

1986 films
1980s biographical drama films
1986 LGBT-related films
British biographical drama films
British LGBT-related films
British independent films
1980s avant-garde and experimental films
British avant-garde and experimental films
Biographical films about painters
Caravaggio
Films set in the 1590s
Films set in the 1600s
Films set in the 1610s
Films set in Italy
Films directed by Derek Jarman
Films with screenplays by Suso Cecchi d'Amico
1986 drama films
Cultural depictions of Italian men
Cultural depictions of 17th-century painters
1980s English-language films
1980s British films
Biographical films about LGBT people